Hyponerita ishima is a moth of the subfamily Arctiinae. It was described by William Schaus in 1933. It is found in Brazil.

References

Phaegopterina
Moths described in 1933